The hippocampus is an anatomical subdivision of the brain, so named for its physical resemblance to a seahorse.

Hippocampus or Hippocamp may refer to:

Science
 Hippocampus (fish), the seahorse genus
 Hippocamp (moon), a natural satellite of Neptune

Other uses
 Hippocampus (journal), an academic publication
 Hippocampus (mythology) or hippocamp, a mythological sea-horse
 Hippo Campus, an American indie rock band